Football at the 2017 Pacific Mini Games was held in Port Vila between 2–15 December 2017.

Entrants
Six men's teams and four women's teams participated:

Men's tournament

Women's tournament

Results

See also
 Football at the Pacific Games

References

External links
 Official Website

 
2017 Pacific Mini Games
Pacific Mini Games
2017
2017 Pacific Mini Games